Flaming Gorge can refer to:

 Flaming Gorge Dam, the dam in northeastern Utah, United States that forms the Flaming Gorge Reservoir
 Flaming Gorge National Recreation Area, a recreation area surrounding the Flaming Gorge Reservoir in northern eastern Utah and southwestern Wyoming in the Western United States
 Flaming Gorge Reservoir, the reservoir on the Green River in northern eastern Utah and southwestern Wyoming in the Western United States
 Flaming Gorge Valley, a valley in Daggett County, Utah, United States
 Flaming Gorge, Utah, a census-designated place in Daggett County, Utah, United States